is a Japanese former  professional baseball pitcher who played for the Chunichi Dragons in Japan's Nippon Professional Baseball in 2010. He attended Teikyo High School.

External links

1990 births
Living people
Baseball people from Saitama Prefecture
Nippon Professional Baseball pitchers
Japanese baseball players
Chunichi Dragons players